A kanger (also known as kangri or kangid or kangir) is an earthen pot woven around with wicker filled with hot embers used by Kashmiris beneath their traditional clothing pheran to keep the chill at bay, which is also regarded as a work of art. It is normally kept inside the Pheran, the Kashmiri cloak, or inside a blanket. It is mostly used in the cold nights of Chillai Kalan. If a person is wearing a jacket, it may be used as a hand warmer. It comes in different variants, small ones for children and large ones for adults.

Background

After the earthen pots are moulded and fired, the artisans complete the wickerwork around them, by erecting two arms to handle the pot, propping the back side with strong wicker sticks, and colour it (optionally) to give an aesthetically delicate shape. The final product then goes to the market.

History
It is generally believed that Kashmiris learned the use of the kangri from the Italians who were in the retinue of the Mughal emperors and usually visited the Valley during summer. In Italy (where a similar device was known as a scaldino) and Spain, braziers were made in a great variety of shapes and were profusely ornamented. Historical data, however, contradict the claim that kangri came to Kashmir from Italy, but it is known that it was used in the time of the Mughal Empire. Those visiting Kashmir for the first time during the winter season are surprised to find people carrying firepots in their hands or in their laps but every Kashmiri knows how to handle the apparatus with care. It is a part of Kashmiri tradition and even in modern times it sees a huge demand, and is even used in public or private offices during winters.

Current use

Kashmiri people burn kangri on the occasion of a local festival, marking the end of winter season. Isband (Peganum harmala), aromatic seeds believed to push away negative energies, are burnt in a kanger to mark a good beginning to a party.

Beyond Kashmir, people of the erstwhile Hill states of Himachal, Uttarakhand, and some parts of Nepal also use other local variants of Kangri.

In 2015, a shopkeeper in Srinagar commissioned a kangri, described as the world's largest, to attract customers to his textile shop. Kashmir Life reported that the size, over a metre long, posed technical challenges to the wicker-weavers.

Manufacturing 
Charari Sharief town is the most famous for a peculiar kind of kangri called "charar kangir". Anantnag is also another major producer. The sector is not organized but is covered under different government schemes.

Popular culture
This Kashmiri proverb, "what Laila was on Majnun’s bosom (Legendary Lovers), so is the Kanger to a Kashmiri", sums up the relationship between a Kashmiri and the Kanger and its cultural importance, which is also shown by this verse:

Ai kangri! ai kangri!
Kurban tu Hour wu Peri!
Chun dur bughul mi girimut
Durd az dil mi buree.
(Oh, kangri! oh, kangri!
You are the gift of Houris and Fairies;
When I take you under my arm
You drive fear from my heart.)
The word "kangdi" appears in a song titled Naam Ada Likhna sung by Shreya Goshal and Shaan.

Medical hazards
Regular use of the kanger can cause a specific skin cancer known as kangri cancer. This effect was first studied by W. J. Elmslie in 1866 and was thought to be caused by burns, but it is now thought to be the result of a carcinogenic distillation product of woodcoal.

World Kangri Day
The tourism department of Azad Jammu and Kashmir (AJK) has finalised to celebrate 'Pheran and Kangri Day’ on Feb 19 to promote Kashmiri culture.

See also
Phiran
Chillai Kalan
Hand warmer
Kangri Cancer
Pulhoer

References

Culture of Jammu and Kashmir
Kashmiri culture
Heating